The Improvement Science Research Network (ISRN) is a research network for academics and physicians who are conducting studies in the new medical field of improvement science.

Founded in 2009, ISRN is part of the Institute for Integration of Medicine and Science at the University of Texas Health Science Center San Antonio (UTHSCSA).  It is housed in the UTHSCSA School of Nursing.  The principal investigator is Kathleen R. Stevens, EdD, MS, RN, ANEF, FAAN). ISRN is supported by the National Institutes of Health (NIH) through funds from the American Recovery and Reinvestment Act.

ISRN Membership is open to  healthcare researchers, academic and clinical scientists, clinicians, clinical leaders, administrators, and those with a specific interest in patient safety and improvement research.

Services 
ISRN provides a national laboratory for investigators from across broad geographical range to study improvement, healthcare delivery systems, dissemination, implementation, translation, safety, and patient outcomes.

ISRN infrastructure supports virtual collaboration in the conduct of network studies through direct engagement of study partners and sites, network study principal investigators, and centralized support. ISRN is registered with the Agency for Healthcare Research and Quality as an active PBRN.

Improvement science
improvement science" is an emerging field that shares common aspects with implementation science, translational science, healthcare delivery science, and knowledge translation. These fields are similar in their focus on transforming what is learned from research into common practice to improve care processes and outcomes. "Improvement science" is proposed as the most inclusive term in this list and is proposed as a specialty within health services research.

Terminology
The ISRN framework and the Stevens Star Model of Knowledge Transformation (Stevens, 2015) are reflected in an international effort to create common terminology of organizational interventions for implementing best evidence-based practices into health practices, systems and policies.

To date, this effort resulted in development of a simplified model of interventions to promote and integrate evidence into health practices, systems, and policies (Colquhoun, et al., 2013) and a review of classification schemes for these interventions (Lokker, C., et al., 2015).

Research priorities
ISRN has established national stakeholder consensus on research priorities that distinguish it from other practice-based research networks (Stevens & Ovretveit, 2013). These priorities highlight gaps in improvement knowledge as identified by clinical and academic scholars, leaders, and change agents across major healthcare disciplines. The research priorities guide decisions about the direction of ISRN discovery and dissemination efforts toward ISRN-sponsored knowledge in each of the following domains of improvement science:

 Coordination and Transitions of Care – this category emphasizes strategies for improvement to care processes in specific clinical conditions. At this time, care coordination and transitions of care are the key clinical focus. Examples of Research Issues: Team performance, medication reconciliation, discharge for prevention of early readmission, patient centered care, measurement of targeted outcomes.
 High Performing Clinical Systems and Microsystems Approaches to Improvement – this category emphasizes structure and process in clinical care and healthcare as complex adaptive systems. Examples of Research Issues: Frontline provider engagement, factors related to uptake, adoption and implementation, sustaining improvements and improvement processes.
 Evidence-Based Quality Improvement and Best Practice – this category emphasizes closing the gap between knowledge and practice through transforming knowledge and designating and implementing best practices. Examples of Research Issues: Develop and critically appraise clinical practice guidelines, adoption and spread of best practices, customization of best practices, institutional elements in adoption, defining best practice in absence of evidence, consumers in EBP, technology-based integration.
 Learning Organizations and Culture of Quality and Safety – this category emphasizes human factors and other aspects of a system related to organizational culture and commitment to quality and safety. Examples of Research Issues: Unit based nursing quality teams, protecting strategy from culture, engendering values and beliefs for culture of patient safety.

Governance 
ISRN is affiliated with the PBRN Resource Center of the Institute for Integration of Medicine and Science, University of Texas Health Science Center San Antonio. Through this alignment, ISRN addresses "Translational Science 3" (T3) phases of moving knowledge into practice.

ISRN is advised by the ISRN Steering Council. The Steering Council is composed of twelve healthcare experts, leaders, and stakeholders from both private and public agencies and facilities. .

ISRN activities are supported by a coordinating team housed in the School of Nursing.

Events

Web events
The first session of the ISRN web event series, "The Way Forward: An Introduction to Improvement Science", was held in June 2010.

Presented by Jack Needleman, PhD, FAAN, and Kathleen R. Stevens, this introductory session showcased the activities of the ISRN as a catalyst for change. The discussion included definition of improvement science, exploration of the overlapping paradigms of improvement science, translational science, and implementation science and explanation of the need and context for improvement research and a discussion of improvement science research methods, study opportunities, and ISRN research results.

External links 

 Institute for Integration of Medicine and Science  
 Kathleen R. Stevens,

See also
 ACE STAR Model of Knowledge Transformation

References 

 Agency for Healthcare Research and Quality (AHRQ)(2006). Fact Sheet: AHRQ support for primary care practice-based research networks (PBRNs). Rockville, MD: The Agency. Retrieved from nttp:/www.ahrq.gov/research/pbrn/bprnfact.htm
 American Nurses Association (ANA). (2007) The National Database of Nursing Quality Indicators (NDNQI). Washington, DC: ANA.
 Berwick DM. (2008). The science of improvement. JAMA. 2008;299(10):1182-4.
 Bietz, M.J., Abrams, S, Cooper, D.M., Stevens, K.R., Puga, F., Patel, D.I, ... Olson, J,S. (2012). Improving the odds through the Collaboration Success Wizard. Translational Behavioral Medicine, 1–7.
 Colquhoun, H., Leeman, J., Michie, S., Lokker, C., Bragge, P., Hempel, S.,... Grimshaw, J.(2014). Towards a simplified model of interventions to promote and integrate evidence into health practices, systems, and policies. Implementation Science, 9, 51. (open access)
 Davidoff, F., Batalden, P., Stevens, D., Ogrinc, G., & Mooney, S. (2008). Publication guidelines for improvement studies in health care: evolution of the SQUIRE project. Annals of Internal Medicine. 149(9,670-677.
 Dolor, R.J., Smith, P.C., Neale, A.V. & Agency for Health Care Research and Quality Practice-Based Research Network (2008). Institutional review board training for community practices: advice from the Agency for Healthcare Research and Quality Practice-Based Research Network listserv. Journal of the American Board of Family Medicine, 21(4):345-352.
 Graham, D.G., Spano, M.S., Stewart, T.V., Staton, E.W., Meers, A., & Pace, W.D. (2007). Strategies for planning and launching PBRN research studies: a project of the Academy of Family Physicians National Research Network (AAFP NRN). Journal of the American Board of Family Medicine. Mar-Apr;20(2),220-228.
 Newhouse, R.P., Pettit, J.C., Poe S., & Rocco L. (2006). The slippery slope: differentiating between quality improvement and research. Journal of Nursing Administration, 36(4),211-219.
 Newhouse, R., Bobay, K, Dykes, P.C., Stevens, K.R., & Titler, M. (2013). Methodology issues in implementation science. Medical Care, 51(4 Suppl. 2), S32-S40.
 Patel, D.I., Stevens, K.R., & Puga, F. (2013). Variations in Institutional Review Board approval in the implementation of an improvement science research study. Nursing Research and Practice. Article ID 548591, 6 pages. (open access)
 Puga, F, Stevens, K.R. & Patel, D. I. (2013). Adoption of best practices in team science within in a healthcare improvement research network. Nursing Research and Practice. Article ID 814360, 7 pages. (open access)
 Sorra, J.S. and Nieva, V.F. (2004). Hospital survey on patient safety culture (Publication No. 04-0041). Rockville, MD: Agency for Healthcare Research and Quality.
 Stevens, K.R. & Ovretveit, J. (2013). Improvement research priorities: USA survey and expert consensus. Nursing Research and Practice, 2013 (Article ID 695729), 1–8.(open access)
 Stevens, K.R., Puga, F, Patel, D.I. (2012). An Evidence-Based Research Collaborative Guide. San Antonio, TX: Academic Center for Evidence-Based Practice, University of Texas Health Science Center at San Antonio.
 Stevens, K,R. (2012). Stevens Star Model of EBP: Knowledge transformation. Center for Advancing Clinical Excellence. The University of Texas Health Science Center at San Antonio.
 Stevens, K. R. (2013). The impact of evidence-based practice in nursing and the next big ideas. Online Journal of Issues in Nursing, 8(2), 4. (open access)
 Stevens, K. R. (2011). National Institute of Nursing Research has widened the Flue Highway of translation research [Letter]. Research & Theory for Nursing Practice: An International Journal. 25(3), 157–159.
 Vincent, D., Hastings-Tolsma, M. & Stevens, K.R. (2013). Dissemination and implementation research: Intersection between nursing science and health care delivery. Nursing Research and Practice, Article ID 802767.

Scientific organizations based in the United States